The following is a list of episodes of the television series Mysteries and Scandals.

Series overview

Episode list

Season 1: 1998–1999

Season 2: 1999–2000

Season 3: 2000-2001

Mysteries and Scandals